The Convair R3Y Tradewind was an American 1950s turboprop-powered flying boat designed and built by Convair.

Design and development

Convair received a request from the United States Navy in 1945 for the design of a large flying boat using new technology developed during World War II, especially the laminar flow wing and still-developing turboprop technology. Their response was the Model 117. It was a large high-wing flying boat with Allison T40 engines driving six-bladed contra-rotating propellers. It had a sleek body with a single-step hull and a slender high-lift wing with fixed floats. The Navy ordered two prototypes on 27 May 1946. Designated XP5Y-1, the first aircraft first flew on 18 April 1950 at San Diego. In August the aircraft set a turboprop endurance record of eight hours six minutes. The Navy decided not to proceed with the patrol boat version, instead directing that the design should be developed into a passenger and cargo aircraft.

One of the XP5Y-1 prototypes was lost in a non-fatal accident on 15 July 1953, while design and development continued on the passenger and cargo version of the aircraft. The transport and cargo version was designated the R3Y-1 Tradewind and first flew on 25 February 1954. Major changes were the removal of all armament and of the tailplane dihederal, the addition of a 10 ft (3.05 m) port-side access hatch, and redesigned engine nacelles to accept improved T40-A-10 engines. Cabin soundproofing and air conditioning were added for pressurized accommodation for 103 passengers or 24 tons of cargo. As a medevac aircraft, 92 stretcher cases could be carried.

A total of eleven aircraft were built. The first two prototypes built were in P5Y configuration, armed with 8,000 lb (3,600 kg) of munitions (bombs, mines, depth charges, torpedoes) and five pairs of 20 mm cannon in fore and aft side emplacements and a tail turret. The next five were built as R3Y-1 aircraft, intended for troop transport and inflight refueling tanker service. The final six were built as the R3Y-2 variant with a lifting nose and high cockpit (similar in concept to the C-5 Galaxy's nose and cockpit) for heavier transport and landing-ship duties.

The front-loading R3Y-2 aircraft with a hinged nose and high cockpit were intended to be a Flying LST (landing craft). In practice, it was discovered that it was almost impossible for the pilots to hold the aircraft steady and nose on to the beach while the aircraft was loaded or unloaded. The aircraft were converted into tankers for the inflight refueling role. They had a short service life due to unsolvable reliability problems of their Allison T40 turboprop engines, a fate common to most T40-powered aircraft, such as the Douglas A2D Skyshark attack aircraft.

Operational service

This record still stands.

After service trials the aircraft were delivered to a U.S. Navy air transport squadron, VR-2, on 31 March 1956. Problems with the engine/propeller combination led to the ending of Tradewind operations and the unit was disbanded on 16 April 1958.

The six R3Y-2s were converted into four-point in-flight tankers using the probe-and-drogue method. In September 1956 one example was the first aircraft to successfully refuel four others simultaneously in flight in 1956, refueling four Grumman F9F Cougars.

The program was halted after thirteen aircraft were built, the reason being the unreliability of the Allison T-40 turboprops. The crash of one of the two XP5Y-1 aircraft was judged due to catastrophic engine failure; when little progress was being made with the engine problems, the Navy halted the program. Subsequently, three more aircraft were lost through engine failures, and the Navy gave up on the T-40 and aircraft powered by it. All the P5Y and R3Y aircraft were grounded in 1958 and subsequently broken up.

Variants
XP5Y-1
Prototype patrol flying boat, two built.
R3Y-1
Transport aircraft for the United States Navy with side loading door, 5 built.
R3Y-2
Assault transport aircraft for the USN with shorter nose incorporating an upward-opening loading door, later converted to four-point tankers for probe-and-drogue operations, six built.

Operators

 United States
 United States Navy

Specifications (R3Y-1)

See also

References

Notes

Bibliography

Door, Robert F. "Beyond the Frontiers: Convair R3Y Tradewind 'The Flying LST'" Wings of Fame, Volume 18, December 1999, Aerospace Publishing, 
Ginter, Steve. Convair XP5Y-1 & R3Y-1/2 Tradewind. Simi Valley, Calif.: Ginter Books, 1996. .
Gunston, Bill. "Turbo Tradewind" Aeroplane Monthly, Volume 20, Issue 01, 1992

External links

Convair R3Y Tradewind articles and publications
World's First Turboprop Flying Boat, July 1950, Popular Science article with photos of XP5Y-1

Aircraft with contra-rotating propellers
R3Y
Flying boats
Convair P5Y Tradewind
1950s United States military transport aircraft
Four-engined tractor aircraft
Four-engined turboprop aircraft
High-wing aircraft
Aircraft first flown in 1954